A Journal for Jordan is a 2021 American romantic drama film directed and co-produced by Denzel Washington from a screenplay written by Virgil Williams, based on the memoir A Journal for Jordan: A Story of Love and Honor by Dana Canedy. The film stars Michael B. Jordan (who also co-produced the film) and Chanté Adams in the lead roles, along with Jalon Christian, Robert Wisdom, and Tamara Tunie in supporting roles.

The film was released by Sony Pictures Releasing, through the Columbia Pictures banner, on December 25, 2021. It received mixed-to-negative reviews from critics and was a box office bomb.

Plot 
Based on a true story, while 1st Sergeant Charles Monroe King is deployed in Iraq, he keeps a journal of love and advice for his infant son. Sharing this journal with her son, his fiancée, Dana Canedy reflects on her unlikely yet powerful romantic relationship with King.

Cast 
 Michael B. Jordan as 1st Sergeant Charles Monroe King
 Chanté Adams as Dana Canedy
 Jalon Christian as Jordan
 Robert Wisdom as Sergeant T.J. Canedy
 Tamara Tunie as Penny Canedy
 Jasmine Batchelor as Gwen Canedy
 Marchánt Davis as Mike Canedy
 Susan Pourfar as Miriam
 Cleveland Berto as Mohammed
 Vanessa Aspillga as Robin
 Grey Henson as Ciro
 Johnny M. Wu as Manny
 David Wilson Barnes as Schaefer
 Melanie Nicholls-King as Kaleshia

Production 
In January 2018, it was reported that Denzel Washington would direct the film Journal for Jordan from a script by Virgil Williams based on Dana Canedy's memoir. In February 2019, it was reported that Michael B. Jordan would play the lead role. In October 2020, Chanté Adams was cast  in the film. As of December 2020, production had begun. In February 2021, Robert Wisdom, Johnny M. Wu, and Jalon Christian joined the cast. In March 2021, Tamara Tunie joined the cast.

Release
A Journal for Jordan was originally scheduled by Sony Pictures Releasing for a limited theatrical release on December 10, 2021, before going wide on December 22. In October 2021, the film was pushed to a wide theatrical release on December 25, on Christmas Day, without a limited release. The film had its world premiere at the AMC Lincoln Square Theatre on December 9, 2021. The film was released video-on-demand on January 11, 2022 and will be released on Blu-ray and DVD on March 8, 2022.

Reception

Box office 
In the United States, A Journal for Jordan was released alongside American Underdog and the wide expansion of Licorice Pizza, and was projected to gross around $5 million from 2,500 theaters over its first two days of release. It made $1.2 million on its first day and $1 million on its second, debuting to $2.2 million and finishing eighth at the box office. In its second weekend, the film finished ninth with $1.2 million. The film dropped out of the box office top ten in its third weekend, finishing twelfth with $600,880.

Critical response 
On review aggregator website Rotten Tomatoes, the film holds an approval rating of 39% based on 62 reviews, with an average rating of 5.2/10. The site's critics consensus reads, "A Journal for Jordan's affecting fact-based story stumbles onscreen due to Denzel Washington's undistinguished direction and overly sentimental approach." On Metacritic, it has a weighted average score of 42 out of 100 based on 20 reviews, indicating "mixed or average reviews". Audiences polled by CinemaScore gave the film an average grade of "A−" on an A+ to F scale.

The motion picture had three nominations at the 53rd NAACP Image Awards for Outstanding Directing in a Motion Picture, Outstanding Writing in a Motion Picture and Outstanding Breakthrough Performance in a Motion Picture for Jalon Christian's performance.

References

External links 

 

2021 drama films
American drama films
Bron Studios films
Columbia Pictures films
Escape Artists films
Films based on memoirs
Films directed by Denzel Washington
Films produced by Denzel Washington
Films scored by Marcelo Zarvos
2020s English-language films
2020s American films